Caroline Masson (born 14 May 1989) is a German professional golfer, currently playing on the Ladies European Tour (LET).

Amateur and college career
Born and raised in Gladbeck in North Rhine-Westphalia, Masson had a decorated amateur golf career. She competed for Germany in the 2006 Espirito Santo Trophy (World Amateur Team Championship) and won the German Stroke Play Championship. She also represented Europe in the 2005 and 2007 Junior Solheim Cup. In 2008, she advanced to match play at the British Ladies Amateur, won the German Match Play Championship and the German Ladies International and was selected to represent Germany at the 2008 Espirito Santo Trophy.

After graduating from secondary school in Gladbeck in 2008, Masson accepted a golf scholarship to Oklahoma State University and played one year for the Cowgirls in 2008–09 before turning pro in December 2009.

Professional career
In late 2009, Masson entered the four-round LET Final Qualifying School as an amateur at La Manga Club, Spain.  After earning medalist honors on 21 December, she turned professional immediately and joined the LET on 1 January 2010.

Masson made 14 of 16 cuts on the LET in 2010, but missed the cut by ten strokes in her first major, the 2010 Women's British Open at Royal Birkdale. In her second major, the 2011 Women's British Open at Carnoustie, she led after the second and third rounds. Paired with defending and eventual champion Yani Tseng in the final round, Masson carded a 78 (+6) to  finish tied for fifth, seven shots back.

Masson won her first LET event at the 2012 South African Women's Open, winning by one stroke over Lee-Anne Pace and Danielle Montgomery.

Masson finished T-11 at the LPGA Final Qualifying Tournament to earn her LPGA Tour card for 2013.

On 4 September 2016 Masson captured her first LPGA Tour victory by winning the Manulife LPGA Classic.

Professional wins (2)

LPGA Tour (1)

Ladies European Tour (1)

Results in LPGA majors
Results not in chronological order before 2019.

^ The Evian Championship was added as a major in 2013.

CUT = missed the half-way cut
WD = withdrew
NT = no tournament
"T" = tied

Summary

Most consecutive cuts made – 8 (2018 Evian – 2020 ANA)
Longest streak of top-10s – 1 (five times)

Ladies European Tour career summary

World ranking
Position in Women's World Golf Rankings at the end of each calendar year.

Team appearances
Amateur
European Girls' Team Championship (representing Germany): 2005, 2006 (winners), 2007
Junior Solheim Cup (representing Europe): 2005, 2007 (winners)
Espirito Santo Trophy (representing Germany): 2006, 2008
European Ladies' Team Championship (representing Germany): 2008, 2009

Professional
Solheim Cup (representing Europe): 2013 (winners), 2015, 2017, 2019 (winners)

Solheim Cup record

References

External links

  
 
 
 
 
 Biography on Peter Henke Web site
 
 
 

German female golfers
Ladies European Tour golfers
LPGA Tour golfers
Solheim Cup competitors for Europe
Olympic golfers of Germany
Golfers at the 2016 Summer Olympics
Golfers at the 2020 Summer Olympics
Oklahoma State Cowgirls golfers
People from Gladbeck
Sportspeople from Münster (region)
1989 births
Living people
21st-century German women